Citizens Advice International (CAI) is an organisation registered in Belgium that was established in 2004. It is an umbrella organisation that represents advice organisations throughout the world. It works at a European level with the European Citizen Action Service. Citizens Advice International aims to promote free advice services and provide support to Citizens Advice organisations throughout the world. Citizens Advice International is not controlled by the British Citizens Advice charity.

References

External links
Citizens Advice International

Citizens Advice
Organizations established in 2004
International charities
Organisations based in Brussels
International organisations based in Belgium
Advice organizations